The men's long jump event at the 1974 British Commonwealth Games was held on 27 and 29 January at the Queen Elizabeth II Park in Christchurch, New Zealand.

Medalists

Results

Qualification
Held on 27 January.

Final
Held on 29 January.

References

Athletics at the 1974 British Commonwealth Games
1974